Roy Chiu (born 14 October 1981) is a Taiwanese actor, singer and racing driver. He earned two Golden Horse Award for Best Leading Actor nominations for his performances in Dear Ex (2018) and Man in Love (2021) and also received two Taipei Film Award for Best Actor for these two performances.

Filmography

Television series

Film

Music video appearances

Discography

Studio albums

Compilation albums

Soundtrack albums

Awards and nominations

References

External links

 

1981 births
Living people
Taiwanese people of Hakka descent
Taiwanese male film actors
Male actors from Taipei
Taiwanese Buddhists
Taiwanese Mandopop singers
Musicians from Taipei
Taiwanese racing drivers
Hakka musicians
21st-century Taiwanese male actors
21st-century Taiwanese male singers
Taiwanese male television actors
University of Taipei alumni